Cawston Ostrich Farm, located in South Pasadena, California, United States, was opened in 1886 by Edwin Cawston. It was America's first ostrich farm and was located in the Arroyo Seco Valley just three miles (5 km) north of downtown Los Angeles and occupied nine acres.

Founding 
In 1885 Edwin Cawston chartered a ship to take fifty of some of the best obtainable ostriches in the world from South Africa to Galveston, Texas. From there, the ostriches endured a treacherous train journey to South Pasadena, California. Out of the original fifty, only eighteen survived. Cawston bounced back from the loss of over half of his stock and the Ostrich Farm eventually boasted over 100 ostriches from the original batch.

Tourism 

The Cawston Ostrich Farm became a premier tourist attraction for many years. Its proximity to the Pasadena and Los Angeles Electric Railway's trolley line that came through from downtown Los Angeles brought many tourists to visit the farm through the earlier part of the 20th century. Guests were able to ride on the backs of ostriches, be taken for ostrich drawn carriage rides and buy ostrich feathered hats, boas, capes and fans at the Ostrich Farm store that was connected to the factory. The ostrich farm feather products were shipped and sold throughout the world. The farm closed in 1935.

Most of the original brick structure of the factory and store remains today and is South Pasadena Cultural Landmark #18.

In 1910 there were 10 Ostrich Farms in Southern California.

References

External links

Article from the Omaha Public Library
Cawston ostrich feather fan in the Staten Island Historical Society Online Collections Database
Image of a woman feeding an ostrich from a bucket at Cawston Ostrich Farm, South Pasadena, 1935. Los Angeles Times Photographic Archive (Collection 1429). UCLA Library Special Collections, Charles E. Young Research Library, University of California, Los Angeles.

1886 establishments in California
Farms in California
South Pasadena, California
Tourist attractions in California
1935 disestablishments in California
Ostrich farms